The 2017 Supercopa de España was the 34th edition of the Supercopa de España, an annual two-legged football tie contested by the winners of the previous season's La Liga and Copa del Rey competitions.

The tie was played in August 2017 between the winners of the 2016–17 Copa del Rey and holders of the Supercopa, Barcelona, and the champions of the 2016–17 La Liga, Real Madrid. This was the first time since the 2012 edition that the Supercopa featured El Clásico.

Real Madrid won the Supercopa de España 5–1 on aggregate for their 10th title.

Match details

First leg
The first half of the match ended goalless. Five minutes into the second half, Marcelo fired a ground cross that deflected off Piqué's foot, resulting in an own goal. Four minutes later, Real Madrid had a great opportunity to score when Benzema did a stepover and evaded Pique's tackle, then sent a cross to Dani Carvajal across the goal and Carvajal shot but Jordi Alba cleared it on the goal line. In the 70th minute, Cristiano Ronaldo scored after a pass from Casemiro but it was ruled offside. Seven minutes later, Luis Suárez was brought down in the box by Keylor Navas, resulting in a penalty, which was subsequently converted by Messi.

Messi's strike marked his 25th goal in the fixture. Three minutes later, in the 80th minute, Real scored their second through a counter attack when Isco assisted Ronaldo with a long ball who shot into the top right corner from the edge of the box. Ronaldo was booked for removing his shirt as part of the celebration. Two minutes later he was booked again by the referee for allegedly diving when he collided with Samuel Umtiti in the box, which resulted in a second yellow card to become a red card, therefore getting suspended for the second leg. Ronaldo was later given a five-match suspension after replays showed him push the referee in frustration for the red card. Real's last goal was scored in the 90th minute in similar fashion to the second, when Asensio shot into the top left corner following an assist from Lucas Vázquez.

Summary

Second leg
The first goal came quite early in the second leg through a Real throw-in the fourth minute following a poor clearance from Samuel Umtiti which resulted in the ball landing in the young Marco Asensio's feet who scored from 30+ yards out with his left foot. In the 32nd minute, Benzema stole the ball from Javier Mascherano and passed it to Lucas Vazquez in the center of the box who then hit the left post. 

Eight minutes after the half-hour mark, Marcelo sent a ground cross in for Benzema who controlled it backwards with his right foot and finished with a left foot half-volley straight into the bottom corner of the net which was enough for the victory. Six minutes after the start of the second half, Raphaël Varane made a poor pass to Mateo Kovačić to let Suarez recover the ball and pass it to Messi who then hit the crossbar inside the box. In the 70th minute, Andre Gomes took a throw in and played it to Suarez who then made a body feint and dribbled past Dani Carvajal. Suarez then played a through ball to Sergi Roberto on the left side of the box who toe poked the ball, which was saved by Navas. Varane's header fell to Ivan Rakitic a few yards outside the box who then passed the ball to Messi who took a shot, which was saved by Navas, and the deflection fell in the path of Suarez who performed a diving header that bounced off the right side post and went out of play.

There was lesser action for the last 20 minutes, although Theo Hernandez, Dani Ceballos and Nélson Semedo came on to make their official debuts respectively.

Summary

See also
El Clásico

References

2017–18 in Spanish football cups
2017
August 2017 sports events in Europe
FC Barcelona matches
Real Madrid CF matches
El Clásico matches